The 1995 Cincinnati Bengals season was the team's 28th year in professional football and its 26th with the National Football League.

With Jeff Blake firmly entrenched as the starting quarterback, the Bengals won their first two games. However, the Bengals would lose their next two, heading into a rematch with Don Shula and the Miami Dolphins, in which the Bengals also lost, 26–23. The Bengals went on to play fairly well the rest of the season, but could not avoid their fifth straight losing season, ending with a 7–9 win–loss record.

One of the season's biggest disappointments was running back Ki-Jana Carter who the Bengals took with first overall pick out of Penn State. Carter would suffer a knee injury in his first preseason game, forcing him to miss his entire rookie season. He would never fully recover, in an injury plagued career.

Offseason

NFL Draft

Personnel

Staff

Roster

Regular season

Schedule

Standings

Team leaders

Passing

Rushing

Receiving

Defensive

Kicking and punting

Special teams

Awards and records

Conference Leaders 
 Carl Pickens, Led AFC, Receptions, (99) 
 Carl Pickens, Led AFC, Touchdowns, (17)

Franchise Records 
 Carl Pickens, Franchise Record, Most Touchdowns in One Season, (17),
 Doug Pelfrey, Franchise Record, Most Field Goals in One Season, (29),
 Doug Pelfrey, Franchise Record, Most Points in One Season, (121),

Milestones 
 Carl Pickens, 2nd 1,000 yard receiving season (1,234 yards) 
 David Dunn, 1st 1,000-yard return season

References

External links 
 
 1995 Cincinnati Bengals at Pro-Football-Reference.com

Cincinnati Bengals
Cincinnati Bengals seasons
Cincin